Yasuo Saitō may refer to:

, Japanese diplomat
, better known as Yakkun Sakurazuka, Japanese comedian and voice actor